Sirilorica is a genus of stem-group scalidophoran from the Sirius Passet.

Morphology 
Sirilorica was a worm-like animal ranging from three to eight centimetres in length.

Ecology 
Sirilorica probably burrowed on the sediment surface, although since it is never preserved alongside burrows the fossils were presumably washed to their final resting places.

Affinity 
The loricate plates align the animal with the loricates and their sister group the priapulids (which have loricae during their juvenile stages).

Etymology 
Its generic name reflects its origin in the Sirius passet, and its loricate appearance. The specific epithet of one species, carlsbergi honours the Carlsberg Foundation's financial contribution to Sirius Passet research.

References

Prehistoric protostome genera

Cambrian genus extinctions